Fujiwara no Takasuke (藤原隆祐 died 1251) was a waka poet and Japanese nobleman active in the Heian period and Kamakura period.

He was the son of Fujiwara no Nagataka.

References

External links 
E-text of his poems in Japanese

Japanese poets
Fujiwara clan
1251 deaths